Ralph S. Evinrude (September 27, 1907 – May 21, 1986) was an American business magnate who was chairman of Outboard Marine Corporation, and the husband of singer and entertainer Frances Langford.

Evinrude was born in Milwaukee, Wisconsin to Bess and Ole Evinrude. Evinrude's father had emigrated from Norway in 1882 and had developed the first commercially feasible outboard motor, thus creating a new industry and form of recreation. In 1927, Evinrude joined the family firm, Elto Outboard Motor Company after two years at the University of Wisconsin–Madison. Ole Evinrude died on July 12, 1934 and Ralph Evinrude took over running the company. In 1936, Elto Outboard Motor Company merged with Waukegan, Illinois-based Johnson Motor Company to form Outboard Marine Corporation (OMC).

In 1936, the Board of Directors of OMC elected Evinrude president and director. In 1953, he was elected vice-chairman of the board and chairman of OMC's Executive Committee. He became chairman of OMC in 1963. During his 55-year career in the family business, Evinrude collaborated with manufacturing giants such as Milwaukee based Briggs and Stratton, and expanded the company's product line to include boats, lawnmowers, snowmobiles, and chain saws, and expanded operations worldwide. In 1982 when Evinrude retired as chairman, OMC had more than 9,000 persons employed in operations throughout the world.

Evinrude was married 3 times. Evinrude’s first wife, Marion Armitage, died. Ralph and Marion had 2 children: Thomas (born 1933) and Sally. Evinrude married his second wife, Joan "Bobbe" Everett in Lake Forest, Illinois in December 1951. In 1955, shortly after his divorce from his 2nd wife, Evinrude married his 3rd wife, Frances Langford and moved to her estate in Jensen Beach, Florida. They shared interests in business and boating and spent much of their time aboard their  yacht Chanticleer. They opened a resort in Jensen Beach called The Outrigger.  Evinrude and Langford also maintained a cottage on a small island at the east end of Baie Fine, a fjord on the north shore of Georgian Bay, in Lake Huron, in what is now Killarney Provincial Park in Ontario, Canada. Chanticleer was often seen tied up at the island during the summer.

During his later working years and during retirement, Evinrude supported a wide variety of philanthropic activities. Some of his interests focused on Florida and the marine industry, but others benefited Milwaukee-area hospitals, institutions of higher education and the arts.

Evinrude died at Martin Memorial Hospital in Stuart, Florida at the age of 78.  OMC has a test center in Stuart which bears his name.

Notes and references

1907 births
1986 deaths
American chief executives of manufacturing companies
American manufacturing businesspeople
American people of Norwegian descent
Businesspeople from Milwaukee
People from Jensen Beach, Florida
20th-century American businesspeople
20th-century American philanthropists